is the 2013 film adaptation of the 2012 & 2013 Kamen Rider Series television series Kamen Rider Wizard. It was released on August 3, 2013, as a double-bill with Zyuden Sentai Kyoryuger: Gaburincho of Music. The film features Takanori Jinnai as Minister Auma who transforms into Kamen Rider Sorcerer. Jinnai is the oldest person to portray a Kamen Rider to date at age 54; the record was previously held by Hiroyuki Watanabe for his portrayal of Kamen Rider Gaoh in Kamen Rider Den-O: I'm Born! who at the time of filming was 51.

Story

The film begins with Haruto confronting a mysterious Golden Magician atop a building who is using an abducted Koyomi to perform a ritual. Kamen Rider Wizard confronts the magician, but fails to stop him from completing the ritual as he uses the Create Ring, causing a rainbow tornado to appear and engulf everything around them. When Haruto and Koyomi wake up in the next day, they find themselves in a different world instead, where all citizens use magic in their daily life and are surprised when they find Shunpei using magic as well and learn that he does not recognize them at all.

While buying at the Donut Shop Hungry, Haruto is informed that in this world, the citizens' mana is used as currency instead of regular money, when an army of Ghouls led by a Phantom named Kherpi appears and attack the citizens in order to bring them into despair. Rinko appears to fight the monsters and Haruto and Koyomi are once again surprised by finding that all citizens have the power to transform into Kamen Rider Mages, including their friends, and defeat them without their help at all.

Haruto and Koyomi explain their situation to Rinko, who also does not recognize them, but are suspicious of their behavior and arrest them, bringing them to their leader, Emperor Maya, whose real appearance is concealed behind a curtain. Haruto confronts Maya in order to learn if he was responsible for transforming the world in its current state, but is struck by a lightning spell instead and Maya lets them go after learning that Koyomi is unable to perform magic at all. While looking for the Golden Magician, Haruto and Koyomi are brought to Kosuke Nitoh instead, who takes an interest in their story and reveals that unlike the other citizens, he uses a handmade Beast Driver he created by studying ancient texts, that does not need to consume Phantoms to sustain itself.

While taking a walk, they stumble across a Magic Ring Shop (the world's counterpart of Okagedomo Antique Shop). When a customer wants to know the function of the Flexible Magic Ring, Wajima appears, transforms into Mage and demonstrate the power much to the customers' disgust as they walk away from the shop save Koyomi and Haruto. Wajima introduces them to his worker, Shiina whom he also gave a shelter after his parents died. Temporarily, Wajima offers the duo a shelter too as Haruto reveals how did he and Koyomi get into their world to Shiina only for making him run away from the shop. Wajima reveals that Shiina's mother and almost everyone were taken away by a giant rainbow tornado with the victims are nowhere to be found. He also had met Emperor Maya and requested that he bring the victims back, to which he agrees and will try his best.

While Haruto and Koyomi are trying to find Shiina, the Golden Magician appears and uses his Tornado Ring to cast away a group of female street dancers into a rainbow Tornado. He walks away, unknowingly watched by Shiina who suspected him to be the culprit. Koyomi meets a guy, who reveals to be the emperor as he desires to talk to her for a while. While Shiina chases the Golden Magician, this eventually leads him to a group of Phantom, which revealed to be the alternate counterparts of Phantom Generals. Shiina transforms and begins to fight. When Haruto was chasing for Shiina, he encounters Kosuke, who tries to fishing for mayonnaise, much to Haruto's shock. Haruto asks whether he sees Shiina or not but later interrupted when they realize that Shiina is under attack. As they arrive, Shiina is already under despair with the duo transforms and easily kill the Phantoms. They dive into Shiina's Underworld and finally found his inner Phantom, Ouroboros. As the inner Phantom get tied, Wizard and Beast use this chance to perform Kick Strike, with both of their Phantoms transform into their Strike Phase and strike Ouroboros.

Shiina awakens, revealing he saw the Golden Magician too retreated to Maya's castle, believing Maya is the culprit. Haruto calms the boy and prepares to investigate the castle again. As he manages to sneak into the castle with Kosuke, they then enter a chamber that shown a machine. Kosuke then reveals to Haruto that the emperor is using a forbidden machine that has the citizens mana, which made Haruto thinking about the Magic Scanners in the city (also knowing where the missing people were taken to). Among the skeletons which stacked at the machine, he saw one of it possessing Shiina's Flower Ring, hinting the bearer to be the corpse of Shiina's mother. As they hear footsteps, they hide as the emperor was having a meeting with the Prime Minister about the machine. After the meeting, the emperor then reveals the purpose of using the machine by draining the citizens' magic. Kosuke accidentally got their cover blown as they escape from the emperor. While running, Kosuke tells Haruto that the emperor would die alone as it is impossible to gather all the mana into a machine. Sorcerer appears and attacks them as they transform, Beast let Wizard escape to tell the citizens of the emperor's plan as he continues to fight Sorcerer alone. Sorcerer overpowers Beast as he uses the Vanish Strike Ring to finish off Beast. Back in the shop, Shiina tries to use magic but he notices that he can't use it as Koyomi reveals to him that Haruto enters his Underworld in order to save him from despair, however, Shiina doesn't believe what she said. Haruto tries telling his friends about the emperor's plan as no one believed him as the emperor made an announcement of capturing Haruto and telling the citizens a lie about Haruto's plan.

After the announcement, guards appears to capture Haruto as he rides his Machine Winger to escape from the guards. While being chased by the Mages, Haruto transform and outsmart them. Wizard then shoots the Magic Scanners until the Captain of the guards stops him. The captain transforms and fight Wizard as he still trying to tell them the truth. The citizens started to hate Wizard after hearing what the emperor said as they throw stuff at him, until Koyomi stops them. She then defends Haruto along with his friends as Koyomi tells him that the emperor is suffering alone. Haruto decides to ride to the castle as Rinko and Shunpei transform to fight the guards. Overpowered by the guards, Kosuke arrives and reveal to the captain that he survive Sorcerer's attack as he transform and overpowers the guards. As Haruto arrives to the chamber, he is too late to stop Maya from activating the machine as the citizens suffer from losing mana (less Koyomi and Shiina). Maya then reveals to Haruto that he is not a magician as no one would accept him. Sorcerer enters the chamber as he reveal himself to be the Drake Phantom and telling Maya the true purpose of the machine: getting all the citizens falling into despair. Maya was shocked after hearing that as Haruto save himself from despair. He then tells Maya that he will destroy Magic Land as Haruto remove the Common Ring from the emperor and shatters it. Both magicians transform and fight each other, but Sorcerer overpowers Wizard. Before Sorcerer could finish off Wizard, he uses the Flower Ring to distract the golden magician before assuming into Infinity Style. As they are about to finish each other, Sorcerer uses to Final Strike Ring as Wizard uses Finish Strike Ring to perform their finisher. As their kicks collide, Wizard ultimately defeated Sorcerer as Magic Land started to vanish. Before return to his world, Wizard tell Maya that they will meet again in their world and Wizard grasp onto Koyomi's hand. As they woke up, Haruto was checking if their friends had the WizarDriver belt, which they don't – assuming that they had returned to their world. While Haruto and Koyomi went to a park, they witnessed a real-life Maya with his family and Shiina with his mother.

Cast
 : 
 : 
 :  
 : 
 : 
 : 
 : 
 : 
 Manager of donut shop: 
 Worker at donut shop: 
 : 
 : 
 Captain of the Imperial Guards: 
 : 
 : 
 Youths: Kamen Rider Girls
 Maya's father: 
 Young Maya: 
 Shiina's mother: 
 Children: , 
 Maya's wife: 
 : 
 Speaking door (Voice):

Theme song
 "The Finale Of The Finale"
 Lyrics: Shoko Fujibayashi
 Composition: Yoshio Nomura
 Arrangement & Artist: Rider Chips

Net movies
To promote the film, Toei is releasing a series of online shorts titled , featuring several unbelievable stories. The  films feature past Kamen Riders as part of Rinko's police force. The  films feature Shunpei as the hero. The  looks at past mystically-themed Kamen Riders. The  films show Koyomi's various interests outside of helping Haruto.

Reception
The film grossed US$12 million in Japan.

References

External links

2010s Kamen Rider films
Magic Land
2013 films
Japanese supernatural horror films
Japanese dark fantasy films
Japanese action horror films
2013 action films
2013 horror films
Superhero horror films